Azuay Department was created with the 1824 reform of the subdivisions of Gran Colombia.

 Cuenca Province - Capital: Cuenca. Cantons: Cuenca, Cañar, Gualaseo y Girón.
 Loja Province - Capital: Loja. Cantons: Loja, Catacocha, Cariamanga y Zaruma.
 Jaén de Bracamoros y Maynas Province - Capital: Jaén de Bracamoros. Cantons: Jaén, Borja y Jeveros.

Departments of Gran Colombia
1824 establishments in Gran Colombia